Asif Ali (born 13 April 1989) is a Pakistani cricketer. He made his first-class debut for Abbottabad in the 2008–09 Quaid-e-Azam Trophy on 1 February 2009.

References

External links
 

1989 births
Living people
Pakistani cricketers
Abbottabad cricketers
Federally Administered Tribal Areas cricketers
Water and Power Development Authority cricketers
People from South Waziristan
Rawalpindi cricketers